Francis Leslie (fl. 1717-1718, last name occasionally Lesley) was a pirate active in the Caribbean. He is best known as one of the leaders of the "Flying Gang" of pirates operating out of New Providence.

History

As part of a plan to reduce piracy in the Caribbean, in September 1717 King George offered a general pardon to pirates, forgiving any who surrendered within a year. The message reached the American colonies but was slow to reach the Caribbean, so on his own initiative Captain Vincent Pearse of  sailed to Nassau to deliver the offer personally. In early 1718 Leslie was among a group of pirate “commanders and ringleaders” including Benjamin Hornigold, Josiah Burgess, and Thomas Nichols, who urged Pearse to release Charles Vane and other captured pirates as an incentive for the others to surrender. Pearse agreed, and Leslie and over 200 others accepted the King’s Pardon. Technically only colonial Governors could grant the pardon, so Leslie, Nichols, and a few others sailed to Bermuda to surrender to Governor Benjamin Bennett, who had sent his son to deliver the offer of Pardon as well.

Leslie wrote a polite letter to Bennett:

See also
Woodes Rogers, Governor of the Bahamas who delivered and enforced the King's Pardon

Notes

References

 

Year of birth missing
Year of death missing
18th-century pirates
Caribbean pirates
Pardoned pirates